The Lalmati Express is an Express train belonging to South Eastern Railway zone that runs between  and  in India. It is currently operated with 12865/12866 train numbers on bi-weekly basis.

Service

Route and halts 
The important halts of the train are:
 
 
 
 
 
 
 
 
 
Presently the service between Howrah and Purulia is adjourned sine die.

Coach composition
The train has standard ICF rakes with a max speed of 110 kmph. The train consists of 9 coaches:
 1 Second Sitting
 7 General Unreserved
 2 Seating cum Luggage Rake

Traction
Both trains are hauled by a Santragachi Loco Shed-based WAP-4 electric locomotive from Howrah to Purulia and vice versa.

Rake sharing 
The train shares its rake with 22875/22876 Kharagpur–Purulia Intercity Express and 22821/22822 Birsa Munda Express.

Notes

References

External links 
 12865/Lalmati Express India Rail Info
 12866/Lalmati Express India Rail Info

Express trains in India
Rail transport in West Bengal
Rail transport in Jharkhand
Rail transport in Howrah
Railway services introduced in 2009
Named passenger trains of India